Hubert Forstinger (born 2 September 1946) is a retired Austrian football referee. He refereed one match in the 1992 UEFA European Football Championship in Sweden that was between France and Denmark.

Forstinger served as a referee during the 1989 FIFA World Youth Championship in Saudi Arabia as well as 1990 and 1994 World Cup qualifiers. He is known to have officiated FIFA matches during the period from 1987 to 1992.

References

External links
Profile

1946 births
Living people
Austrian football referees
UEFA Euro 1992 referees